Narcisa de Jesús Martillo Morán (29 October 1832 – 8 December 1869) was an Ecuadorian Catholic virgin. Martillo was known for her charitable giving and strict devotion to Jesus Christ while living a virginal and austere life of prayer and penance. The death of her parents prompted her to relocate in order to work as a seamstress while caring for the sick and poor. But her devotion to prayer and the mortification of the flesh was strong and it led her to the decision to live as a member of the Third Order of Saint Dominic in Patrocínio, (Peru) in June 1868, where she died on 8 December 1869.

Her cause for sainthood commenced on 27 September 1975, under Pope Paul VI, and she became titled as a Servant of God; while the confirmation of her life of heroic virtue allowed for Pope John Paul II to name her as Venerable on 23 October 1987. Martillo was beatified on 25 October 1992, after the approval of a 1967 miracle. After the confirmation of a miracle attributed to her, Pope Benedict XVI canonised her on 12 October 2008 in Saint Peter's Square.

Life
Narcisa de Jesús Martillo Morán was born on 29 October 1832 in the small village of San José in Nobol in Ecuador as the sixth of nine children born to Pedro Martillo and Josefina Morán who were landowners. Her father was a great worker to the point that he amassed considerable wealth; he had a devotion to Blessed Mariana de Jesús and Saint Jacinto of Poland.

Her mother died in 1838 and she took up much of the domestic chores as a result of this while an elder sister and teacher taught her to read and write as well as to sing and use the guitar; she also learned how to sew and cook. The girl also turned a small room in her house into a domestic chapel. She received her Confirmation on 16 September 1839. Martillo frequented a small wood near her home for contemplation in solitude, while the guava tree near which she went to is now a large pilgrimage destination. The girl also chose the then-Blessed Mariana de Jesús as her patron saint with whom she identified and strove to imitate in her own life. Martillo was known for being sweet and thoughtful with a peaceful and generous disposition; she was obedient to those around her and was well-known and loved in her village. Martillo was blonde with bright blue eyes and was strong and agile; she was also tall.

The death of her father in January 1852 prompted her to relocate to Guayaquil, where she lived with prominent nobles, and it was here that she began her mission of helping the poor and the sick and caring for abandoned children. It was also here that she took a job as a seamstress in order to fund her mission as well as supporting her eight brothers and sisters. But she soon moved to Cuenca for some months where she went from home to home and lived with whoever would take her in including Mercedes de Jesús Molina, to allow herself greater time for silent contemplation and penance. In 1865 her spiritual director fell ill, and died in 1868, which was at the time the local bishop invited her to live with the Carmelites even though she had refused the offer.

In June 1868 she relocated to Lima in Peru at the advice of her new Franciscan spiritual director Pedro Gual where she lived in the Dominican convent at Patrocinio despite not being a nun. It was here that she followed a demanding schedule of eight hours of reflection which was offered in silence and solitude. In addition she devoted four hours of the night to various forms of mortification which included flagellation and the wearing of a crown of thorns. In terms of nourishment she fasted on bread and water alone and took the Eucharist as her sole form of sustenance while she was sometimes seen in an ecstatic state.

In late September 1869 she developed high fevers for which medical remedies could do little and she died as a result before midnight on 8 December 1869; upon her death a nun reported a pleasant and sweet odor filling the room that Martillo had died in. She died upon the opening of the First Vatican Council. Her remains were deemed upon exhumation to be incorrupt in 1955, and were transferred from Peru back to her homeland of Ecuador until 1972, when moved to her village of Nobol. On 22 August 1998 a shrine in her honor was dedicated in Nobol where her remains now rest.

Canonization

Upon her death the cities that she had dwelt in came to revere and acclaim her as a saint while the Dominican nuns she had lived with preserved her remains at their Peru convent. The cause for her canonization later commenced with the beginning of the informative process tasked with collecting documentation from 26 September 1961 until the process was closed on 10 July 1962 at which stage her writings received theological approval on 8 July 1965. The officials in charge of the cause sent a large Positio dossier to Rome to the Congregation for Rites for investigation before historians approved the cause on 8 May 1974. The formal introduction to the cause came under Pope Paul VI on 27 September 1975 and she became titled as a Servant of God as a result. Theologians met to discuss the cause on 24 July 1984 but did not come up with a clear consensus and so met again on 20 December 1984 where the group approved the cause. The members of the Congregation for the Causes of Saints approved the cause as well on 16 June 1987. Martillo became titled as Venerable on 23 October 1987 after Pope John Paul II acknowledged the fact that she had lived a model life of heroic virtue.

One miracle was required for her to be beatified and it had to be a healing that science and medicine could not explain. One such case arose and was investigated in a diocesan tribunal before the findings were submitted to the competent officials in Rome for further investigation. The C.C.S. validated this process on 30 June 1984 while a panel of medical experts approved the miraculous nature of this healing on 27 June 1991. Theologians approved it as well on 20 December 1991 after confirming the miracle came as a result of Martillo's intercession while the C.C.S. approved the findings of both bodies on 18 February 1992. John Paul II approved this miracle on 7 March 1992 and beatified her in Saint Peter's Square on 25 October 1992.

The second and final miracle needed for full sainthood was investigated in the diocese of its origin before it received C.C.S. validation on 4 October 2002 upon all documents being submitted to them in Rome. The medical experts approved this miracle on 18 January 2006 as did the theologians on 4 April 2006 and the C.C.S. on 19 December 2006. Pope Benedict XVI approved this miracle on 1 June 2007 and formalized the date at a gathering of cardinals on 1 March 2008; Benedict XVI canonized Martillo on 12 October 2008.

Miracles
The miracle that led to her beatification was the healing of Juan Pesántez Peñaranda who was single and working in banana plantations in Pasaje in El Oro. He was working when a banana stalk struck him in the head and caused several tumors to appear which repeated surgeries in 1967 could not cure. He was just over 20 at the time and didn't believe in miracles. He was at the Luis Vernanza Hospital when he met a policeman who suggested he write "Narcisita" on a piece of paper. He was skeptical that this would bring results but did this and had a dream of her that night which also caused him to be cured of his tumors.

The miracle that led to her sainthood was the healing of Edelmina Arellano who was cured from a congenital defect in 1992. Edelmina was born without genital organs and at the age of seven was cured after her mother took her to the shrine dedicated to the then-Blessed and appealed for her intercession. It was mere hours later that the child had an appointment with her doctor who testified that the girl was normal like all other children with no defects apparent whatsoever.

References

External links
 Hagiography Circle
 Saints SQPN
 Encyclopedia.com

1832 births
1869 deaths
19th-century Christian saints
19th-century venerated Christians
Beatifications by Pope John Paul II
Canonizations by Pope Benedict XVI
Christian female saints of the Late Modern era
Ecuadorian Roman Catholic saints
Incorrupt saints
People from Guayas Province
Venerated Catholics by Pope John Paul II
19th-century Ecuadorian women